Looking Up may refer to:

Albums
 Looking Up (Hugh Fraser album), 1988
 Looking Up (Autopilot Off album), or the title song, 2000
 Looking Up (Michelle Gayle album), or the title song, 2000

Films
 , 2019 Chinese film

Songs
 "Looking Up" (Elton John song), 2015
 "Looking Up", by Eels from Tomorrow Morning
 "Looking Up", by Michael W. Smith from Michael W. Smith Project
 "Looking Up", by Paramore from Brand New Eyes